The following is a list of managers/head coaches of FK Vardar.

Historical list of coaches

References

External links

Official website 

 
Managers
Vardar